Yannick Rymenants (born 23 January 1989) is a Belgian footballer who plays as a defender.

References
KSK Heist (dutch)

1989 births
Living people
Belgian footballers
Lierse S.K. players
K.V.C. Westerlo players
PSV Eindhoven players
Sint-Truidense V.V. players
K.S.K. Heist players
Association football goalkeepers
Belgian Pro League players
People from Lier, Belgium
Footballers from Antwerp Province